Charles Robert Darwin  (12 February 1809 – 19 April 1882) was an English naturalist, geologist, and biologist, widely known for his contributions to evolutionary biology. His proposition that all species of life have descended from a common ancestor is now generally accepted and considered a fundamental concept in science. In a joint publication with Alfred Russel Wallace, he introduced his scientific theory that this branching pattern of evolution resulted from a process he called natural selection, in which the struggle for existence has a similar effect to the artificial selection involved in selective breeding. Darwin has been described as one of the most influential figures in human history and was honoured by burial in Westminster Abbey.

Darwin's early interest in nature led him to neglect his medical education at the University of Edinburgh; instead, he helped to investigate marine invertebrates. His studies at the University of Cambridge's Christ's College from 1828 to 1831 encouraged his passion for natural science. Publication of his journal of the voyage made Darwin famous as a popular author.

Puzzled by the geographical distribution of wildlife and fossils he collected on the voyage, Darwin began detailed investigations and, in 1838, devised his theory of natural selection. Although he discussed his ideas with several naturalists, he needed time for extensive research and his geological work had priority. He was writing up his theory in 1858 when Alfred Russel Wallace sent him an essay that described the same idea, prompting immediate joint submission of both their theories to the Linnean Society of London. Darwin's work established evolutionary descent with modification as the dominant scientific explanation of diversification in nature. In 1871, he examined human evolution and sexual selection in The Descent of Man, and Selection in Relation to Sex, followed by The Expression of the Emotions in Man and Animals (1872). His research on plants was published in a series of books, and in his final book, The Formation of Vegetable Mould, through the Actions of Worms (1881), he examined earthworms and their effect on soil.

Darwin published his theory of evolution with compelling evidence in his 1859 book On the Origin of Species. By the 1870s, the scientific community and a majority of the educated public had accepted evolution as a fact. However, many favoured competing explanations that gave only a minor role to natural selection, and it was not until the emergence of the modern evolutionary synthesis from the 1930s to the 1950s that a broad consensus developed in which natural selection was the basic mechanism of evolution. Darwin's scientific discovery is the unifying theory of the life sciences, explaining the diversity of life.

Biography

Early life and education

Charles Robert Darwin was born in Shrewsbury, Shropshire, on 12 February 1809, at his family's home, The Mount. He was the fifth of six children of wealthy society doctor and financier Robert Darwin and Susannah Darwin (née Wedgwood). His grandfathers Erasmus Darwin and Josiah Wedgwood were both prominent abolitionists. Erasmus Darwin had praised general concepts of evolution and common descent in his Zoonomia (1794), a poetic fantasy of gradual creation including undeveloped ideas anticipating concepts his grandson expanded.

Both families were largely Unitarian, though the Wedgwoods were adopting Anglicanism. Robert Darwin, a freethinker, had baby Charles baptised in November 1809 in the Anglican St Chad's Church, Shrewsbury, but Charles and his siblings attended the local Unitarian Church with their mother. The eight-year-old Charles already had a taste for natural history and collecting when he joined the day school run by its preacher in 1817. That July, his mother died. From September 1818, he joined his older brother Erasmus in attending the nearby Anglican Shrewsbury School as a boarder.

Darwin spent the summer of 1825 as an apprentice doctor, helping his father treat the poor of Shropshire, before going to the well-regarded University of Edinburgh Medical School with his brother Erasmus in October 1825. Darwin found lectures dull and surgery distressing, so he neglected his studies. He learned taxidermy in around 40 daily hour-long sessions from John Edmonstone, a freed black slave who had accompanied Charles Waterton in the South American rainforest.

In Darwin's second year at the university, he joined the Plinian Society, a student natural-history group featuring lively debates in which radical democratic students with materialistic views challenged orthodox religious concepts of science. He assisted Robert Edmond Grant's investigations of the anatomy and life cycle of marine invertebrates in the Firth of Forth, and on 27 March 1827 presented at the Plinian his own discovery that black spores found in oyster shells were the eggs of a skate leech. One day, Grant praised Lamarck's evolutionary ideas. Darwin was astonished by Grant's audacity, but had recently read similar ideas in his grandfather Erasmus' journals. Darwin was rather bored by Robert Jameson's natural-history course, which covered geology—including the debate between Neptunism and Plutonism. He learned the classification of plants, and assisted with work on the collections of the University Museum, one of the largest museums in Europe at the time.

Darwin's neglect of medical studies annoyed his father, who sent him to Christ's College, Cambridge, in January 1828, to study for a Bachelor of Arts degree as the first step towards becoming an Anglican country parson. Darwin was unqualified for Cambridge's Tripos exams, and was required instead to join the ordinary degree course. He preferred riding and shooting to studying.

During the first few months of Darwin's enrollment at Christ's College, his second cousin William Darwin Fox was still studying there. Fox impressed him with his butterfly collection, introducing Darwin to entomology and influencing him to pursue beetle collecting. He did this zealously, and had some of his finds published in James Francis Stephens' Illustrations of British entomology (1829–32).

Through Fox, Darwin became a close friend and follower of botany professor John Stevens Henslow. He met other leading parson-naturalists who saw scientific work as religious natural theology, becoming known to these dons as "the man who walks with Henslow". When his own exams drew near, Darwin applied himself to his studies and was delighted by the language and logic of William Paley's Evidences of Christianity (1795). In his final examination in January 1831 Darwin did well, coming tenth out of 178 candidates for the ordinary degree.

Darwin had to stay at Cambridge until June 1831. He studied Paley's Natural Theology or Evidences of the Existence and Attributes of the Deity (first published in 1802), which made an argument for divine design in nature, explaining adaptation as God acting through laws of nature. He read John Herschel's new book, Preliminary Discourse on the Study of Natural Philosophy (1831), which described the highest aim of natural philosophy as understanding such laws through inductive reasoning based on observation, and Alexander von Humboldt's Personal Narrative of scientific travels in 1799–1804. Inspired with "a burning zeal" to contribute, Darwin planned to visit Tenerife with some classmates after graduation to study natural history in the tropics. In preparation, he joined Adam Sedgwick's geology course, then on 4 August travelled with him to spend a fortnight mapping strata in Wales.

Survey voyage on HMS Beagle

After leaving Sedgwick in Wales, Darwin spent a few days with student friends at Barmouth. The ship was to leave in four weeks on an expedition to chart the coastline of South America. Robert Darwin objected to his son's planned two-year voyage, regarding it as a waste of time, but was persuaded by his brother-in-law, Josiah Wedgwood II, to agree to (and fund) his son's participation. Darwin took care to remain in a private capacity to retain control over his collection, intending it for a major scientific institution.

After delays, the voyage began on 27 December 1831; it lasted almost five years. As FitzRoy had intended, Darwin spent most of that time on land investigating geology and making natural history collections, while HMS Beagle surveyed and charted coasts. He kept careful notes of his observations and theoretical speculations, and at intervals during the voyage his specimens were sent to Cambridge together with letters including a copy of his journal for his family. He had some expertise in geology, beetle collecting and dissecting marine invertebrates, but in all other areas was a novice and ably collected specimens for expert appraisal. Despite suffering badly from seasickness, Darwin wrote copious notes while on board the ship. Most of his zoology notes are about marine invertebrates, starting with plankton collected during a calm spell.

On their first stop ashore at St Jago in Cape Verde, Darwin found that a white band high in the volcanic rock cliffs included seashells. FitzRoy had given him the first volume of Charles Lyell's Principles of Geology, which set out uniformitarian concepts of land slowly rising or falling over immense periods, and Darwin saw things Lyell's way, theorising and thinking of writing a book on geology. When they reached Brazil, Darwin was delighted by the tropical forest, but detested the sight of slavery, and disputed this issue with Fitzroy.

The survey continued to the south in Patagonia. They stopped at Bahía Blanca, and in cliffs near Punta Alta Darwin made a major find of fossil bones of huge extinct mammals beside modern seashells, indicating recent extinction with no signs of change in climate or catastrophe. He found bony plates like a giant version of the armour on local armadillos. From a jaw and tooth he identified the gigantic Megatherium, then from Cuvier's description thought the armour was from this animal. The finds were shipped to England, and scientists found the fossils of great interest. In Patagonia, Darwin came to wrongly believe the territory was devoid of reptiles. 

On rides with gauchos into the interior to explore geology and collect more fossils, Darwin gained social, political and anthropological insights into both native and colonial people at a time of revolution, and learnt that two types of rhea had separate but overlapping territories. Further south, he saw stepped plains of shingle and seashells as raised beaches at a series of elevations. He read Lyell's second volume and accepted its view of "centres of creation" of species, but his discoveries and theorising challenged Lyell's ideas of smooth continuity and of extinction of species.

Three Fuegians on board, who had been seized during the first Beagle voyage then given Christian education in England, were returning with a missionary. Darwin found them friendly and civilised, yet at Tierra del Fuego he met "miserable, degraded savages", as different as wild from domesticated animals. He remained convinced that, despite this diversity, all humans were interrelated with a shared origin and potential for improvement towards civilisation. Unlike his scientist friends, he now thought there was no unbridgeable gap between humans and animals. A year on, the mission had been abandoned. The Fuegian they had named Jemmy Button lived like the other natives, had a wife, and had no wish to return to England.

Darwin experienced an earthquake in Chile in 1835 and saw signs that the land had just been raised, including mussel-beds stranded above high tide. High in the Andes he saw seashells, and several fossil trees that had grown on a sand beach. He theorised that as the land rose, oceanic islands sank, and coral reefs round them grew to form atolls.

On the geologically new Galápagos Islands, Darwin looked for evidence attaching wildlife to an older "centre of creation", and found mockingbirds allied to those in Chile but differing from island to island. He heard that slight variations in the shape of tortoise shells showed which island they came from, but failed to collect them, even after eating tortoises taken on board as food. In Australia, the marsupial rat-kangaroo and the platypus seemed so unusual that Darwin thought it was almost as though two distinct Creators had been at work. He found the Aborigines "good-humoured & pleasant", their numbers depleted by European settlement.

FitzRoy investigated how the atolls of the Cocos (Keeling) Islands had formed, and the survey supported Darwin's theorising. FitzRoy began writing the official Narrative of the Beagle voyages, and after reading Darwin's diary he proposed incorporating it into the account. Darwin's Journal was eventually rewritten as a separate third volume, on geology and natural history.

In Cape Town, South Africa, Darwin and FitzRoy met John Herschel, who had recently written to Lyell praising his uniformitarianism as opening bold speculation on "that mystery of mysteries, the replacement of extinct species by others" as "a natural in contradistinction to a miraculous process".
When organising his notes as the ship sailed home, Darwin wrote that, if his growing suspicions about the mockingbirds, the tortoises and the Falkland Islands fox were correct, "such facts undermine the stability of Species", then cautiously added "would" before "undermine". He later wrote that such facts "seemed to me to throw some light on the origin of species".

Without telling Darwin, extracts from his letters to Henslow had been read to scientific societies, printed as a pamphlet for private distribution among members of the Cambridge Philosophical Society, and reported in magazines, including The Athenaeum. Darwin first heard of this at Cape Town, and at Ascension Island read of Sedgwick's prediction that Darwin "will have a great name among the Naturalists of Europe".

Inception of Darwin's evolutionary theory

On 2 October 1836 Beagle anchored at Falmouth, Cornwall. Darwin promptly made the long coach journey to Shrewsbury to visit his home and see relatives. He then hurried to Cambridge to see Henslow, who advised him on finding available naturalists to catalogue Darwin's animal collections and to take on the botanical specimens. Darwin's father organised investments, enabling his son to be a self-funded gentleman scientist, and an excited Darwin went round the London institutions being fêted and seeking experts to describe the collections. British zoologists at the time had a huge backlog of work, due to natural history collecting being encouraged throughout the British Empire, and there was a danger of specimens just being left in storage.

Charles Lyell eagerly met Darwin for the first time on 29 October and soon introduced him to the up-and-coming anatomist Richard Owen, who had the facilities of the Royal College of Surgeons to work on the fossil bones collected by Darwin. Owen's surprising results included other gigantic extinct ground sloths as well as the Megatherium Darwin had identified, a near complete skeleton of the unknown Scelidotherium and a hippopotamus-sized rodent-like skull named Toxodon resembling a giant capybara. The armour fragments were actually from Glyptodon, a huge armadillo-like creature, as Darwin had initially thought. These extinct creatures were related to living species in South America.

In mid-December, Darwin took lodgings in Cambridge to arrange expert classification of his collections, and prepare his own research for publication. Questions of how to combine his diary into the Narrative were resolved at the end of the month when FitzRoy accepted Broderip's advice to make it a separate volume, and Darwin began work on his Journal and Remarks.

Darwin's first paper showed that the South American landmass was slowly rising, and with Lyell's enthusiastic backing he read it to the Geological Society of London on 4 January 1837. On the same day, he presented his mammal and bird specimens to the Zoological Society. The ornithologist John Gould soon announced that the Galapagos birds that Darwin had thought a mixture of blackbirds, "gros-beaks" and finches, were, in fact, twelve separate species of finches. On 17 February, Darwin was elected to the Council of the Geological Society, and Lyell's presidential address presented Owen's findings on Darwin's fossils, stressing geographical continuity of species as supporting his uniformitarian ideas.

Early in March, Darwin moved to London to be near this work, joining Lyell's social circle of scientists and experts such as Charles Babbage, who described God as a programmer of laws. Darwin stayed with his freethinking brother Erasmus, part of this Whig circle and a close friend of the writer Harriet Martineau, who promoted the Malthusianism that underpinned the controversial Whig Poor Law reforms to stop welfare from causing overpopulation and more poverty. As a Unitarian, she welcomed the radical implications of transmutation of species, promoted by Grant and younger surgeons influenced by Geoffroy. Transmutation was anathema to Anglicans defending social order, but reputable scientists openly discussed the subject and there was wide interest in John Herschel's letter praising Lyell's approach as a way to find a natural cause of the origin of new species.

Gould met Darwin and told him that the Galápagos mockingbirds from different islands were separate species, not just varieties, and what Darwin had thought was a "wren" was in the finch group. Darwin had not labelled the finches by island, but from the notes of others on the ship, including FitzRoy, he allocated species to islands. The two rheas were distinct species, and on 14 March Darwin announced how their distribution changed going southwards.

By mid-March 1837, barely six months after his return to England, Darwin was speculating in his Red Notebook on the possibility that "one species does change into another" to explain the geographical distribution of living species such as the rheas, and extinct ones such as the strange extinct mammal Macrauchenia, which resembled a giant guanaco, a llama relative. Around mid-July, he recorded in his "B" notebook his thoughts on lifespan and variation across generations—explaining the variations he had observed in Galápagos tortoises, mockingbirds, and rheas. He sketched branching descent, and then a genealogical branching of a single evolutionary tree, in which "It is absurd to talk of one animal being higher than another", thereby discarding Lamarck's idea of independent lineages progressing to higher forms.

Overwork, illness, and marriage

While developing this intensive study of transmutation, Darwin became mired in more work. Still rewriting his Journal, he took on editing and publishing the expert reports on his collections, and with Henslow's help obtained a Treasury grant of £1,000 to sponsor this multi-volume Zoology of the Voyage of H.M.S. Beagle, a sum equivalent to about £115,000 in 2021. He stretched the funding to include his planned books on geology, and agreed to unrealistic dates with the publisher. As the Victorian era began, Darwin pressed on with writing his Journal, and in August 1837 began correcting printer's proofs.

As Darwin worked under pressure, his health suffered. On 20 September he had "an uncomfortable palpitation of the heart", so his doctors urged him to "knock off all work" and live in the country for a few weeks. After visiting Shrewsbury he joined his Wedgwood relatives at Maer Hall, Staffordshire, but found them too eager for tales of his travels to give him much rest. His charming, intelligent, and cultured cousin Emma Wedgwood, nine months older than Darwin, was nursing his invalid aunt. His uncle Josiah pointed out an area of ground where cinders had disappeared under loam and suggested that this might have been the work of earthworms, inspiring "a new & important theory" on their role in soil formation, which Darwin presented at the Geological Society on 1 November 1837. His Journal was printed and ready for publication by the end of February 1838, as was the first volume of the Narrative, but FitzRoy was still working hard to finish his own volume.

William Whewell pushed Darwin to take on the duties of Secretary of the Geological Society. After initially declining the work, he accepted the post in March 1838. Despite the grind of writing and editing the Beagle reports, Darwin made remarkable progress on transmutation, taking every opportunity to question expert naturalists and, unconventionally, people with practical experience in selective breeding such as farmers and pigeon fanciers. Over time, his research drew on information from his relatives and children, the family butler, neighbours, colonists and former shipmates. He included mankind in his speculations from the outset, and on seeing an orangutan in the zoo on 28 March 1838 noted its childlike behaviour.

The strain took a toll, by June he was being laid up for days on end with stomach problems, headaches and heart symptoms. For the rest of his life, he was repeatedly incapacitated with episodes of stomach pains, vomiting, severe boils, palpitations, trembling and other symptoms, particularly during times of stress, such as attending meetings or making social visits. The cause of Darwin's illness remained unknown, and attempts at treatment had only ephemeral success.

On 23 June, he took a break and went "geologising" in Scotland. He visited Glen Roy in glorious weather to see the parallel "roads" cut into the hillsides at three heights. He later published his view that these were marine raised beaches, but then had to accept that they were shorelines of a proglacial lake.

Fully recuperated, he returned to Shrewsbury in July. Used to jotting down daily notes on animal breeding, he scrawled rambling thoughts about marriage, career and prospects on two scraps of paper, one with columns headed "Marry" and "Not Marry". Advantages under "Marry" included "constant companion and a friend in old age ... better than a dog anyhow", against points such as "less money for books" and "terrible loss of time". Having decided in favour of marriage, he discussed it with his father, then went to visit his cousin Emma on 29 July. He did not get around to proposing, but against his father's advice he mentioned his ideas on transmutation.

Malthus and natural selection

Continuing his research in London, Darwin's wide reading now included the sixth edition of Malthus's An Essay on the Principle of Population. On 28 September 1838 he noted its assertion that human "population, when unchecked, goes on doubling itself every twenty five years, or increases in a geometrical ratio", a geometric progression so that population soon exceeds food supply in what is known as a Malthusian catastrophe. Darwin was well prepared to compare this to Augustin de Candolle's "warring of the species" of plants and the struggle for existence among wildlife, explaining how numbers of a species kept roughly stable. As species always breed beyond available resources, favourable variations would make organisms better at surviving and passing the variations on to their offspring, while unfavourable variations would be lost. He wrote that the "final cause of all this wedging, must be to sort out proper structure, & adapt it to changes", so that "One may say there is a force like a hundred thousand wedges trying force into every kind of adapted structure into the gaps of in the economy of nature, or rather forming gaps by thrusting out weaker ones." This would result in the formation of new species. As he later wrote in his Autobiography:

By mid-December, Darwin saw a similarity between farmers picking the best stock in selective breeding, and a Malthusian Nature selecting from chance variants so that "every part of newly acquired structure is fully practical and perfected", thinking this comparison "a beautiful part of my theory". He later called his theory natural selection, an analogy with what he termed the "artificial selection" of selective breeding.

On 11 November, he returned to Maer and proposed to Emma, once more telling her his ideas. She accepted, then in exchanges of loving letters she showed how she valued his openness in sharing their differences, while expressing her strong Unitarian beliefs and concerns that his honest doubts might separate them in the afterlife. While he was house-hunting in London, bouts of illness continued and Emma wrote urging him to get some rest, almost prophetically remarking "So don't be ill any more my dear Charley till I can be with you to nurse you." He found what they called "Macaw Cottage" (because of its gaudy interiors) in Gower Street, then moved his "museum" in over Christmas. On 24 January 1839, Darwin was elected a Fellow of the Royal Society (FRS).

On 29 January, Darwin and Emma Wedgwood were married at Maer in an Anglican ceremony arranged to suit the Unitarians, then immediately caught the train to London and their new home.

Geology books, barnacles, evolutionary research

Darwin now had the framework of his theory of natural selection "by which to work", as his "prime hobby". His research included extensive experimental selective breeding of plants and animals, finding evidence that species were not fixed and investigating many detailed ideas to refine and substantiate his theory. For fifteen years this work was in the background to his main occupation of writing on geology and publishing expert reports on the Beagle collections, in particular, the barnacles.

FitzRoy's long delayed Narrative was published in May 1839. Darwin's Journal and Remarks got good reviews as the third volume, and on 15 August it was published on its own. Early in 1842, Darwin wrote about his ideas to Charles Lyell, who noted that his ally "denies seeing a beginning to each crop of species".

Darwin's book The Structure and Distribution of Coral Reefs on his theory of atoll formation was published in May 1842 after more than three years of work, and he then wrote his first "pencil sketch" of his theory of natural selection. To escape the pressures of London, the family moved to rural Down House in Kent in September. On 11 January 1844, Darwin mentioned his theorising to the botanist Joseph Dalton Hooker, writing with melodramatic humour "it is like confessing a murder". Hooker replied "There may in my opinion have been a series of productions on different spots, & also a gradual change of species. I shall be delighted to hear how you think that this change may have taken place, as no presently conceived opinions satisfy me on the subject."

By July, Darwin had expanded his "sketch" into a 230-page "Essay", to be expanded with his research results if he died prematurely. In November, the anonymously published sensational best-seller Vestiges of the Natural History of Creation brought wide interest in transmutation. Darwin scorned its amateurish geology and zoology, but carefully reviewed his own arguments. Controversy erupted, and it continued to sell well despite contemptuous dismissal by scientists.

Darwin completed his third geological book in 1846. He now renewed a fascination and expertise in marine invertebrates, dating back to his student days with Grant, by dissecting and classifying the barnacles he had collected on the voyage, enjoying observing beautiful structures and thinking about comparisons with allied structures. In 1847, Hooker read the "Essay" and sent notes that provided Darwin with the calm critical feedback that he needed, but would not commit himself and questioned Darwin's opposition to continuing acts of creation.

In an attempt to improve his chronic ill health, Darwin went in 1849 to Dr James Gully's Malvern spa and was surprised to find some benefit from hydrotherapy. Then, in 1851, his treasured daughter Annie fell ill, reawakening his fears that his illness might be hereditary, and after a long series of crises she died.

In eight years of work on barnacles, Darwin's theory helped him to find "homologies" showing that slightly changed body parts served different functions to meet new conditions, and in some genera he found minute males parasitic on hermaphrodites, showing an intermediate stage in evolution of distinct sexes. In 1853, it earned him the Royal Society's Royal Medal, and it made his reputation as a biologist. In 1854 he became a Fellow of the Linnean Society of London, gaining postal access to its library. He began a major reassessment of his theory of species, and in November realised that divergence in the character of descendants could be explained by them becoming adapted to "diversified places in the economy of nature".

Publication of the theory of natural selection

By the start of 1856, Darwin was investigating whether eggs and seeds could survive travel across seawater to spread species across oceans. Hooker increasingly doubted the traditional view that species were fixed, but their young friend Thomas Henry Huxley was still firmly against the transmutation of species. Lyell was intrigued by Darwin's speculations without realising their extent. When he read a paper by Alfred Russel Wallace, "On the Law which has Regulated the Introduction of New Species", he saw similarities with Darwin's thoughts and urged him to publish to establish precedence.

Though Darwin saw no threat, on 14 May 1856 he began writing a short paper. Finding answers to difficult questions held him up repeatedly, and he expanded his plans to a "big book on species" titled Natural Selection, which was to include his "note on Man". He continued his researches, obtaining information and specimens from naturalists worldwide including Wallace who was working in Borneo.

In mid-1857 he added a section heading; "Theory applied to Races of Man", but did not add text on this topic. On 5 September 1857, Darwin sent the American botanist Asa Gray a detailed outline of his ideas, including an abstract of Natural Selection, which omitted human origins and sexual selection. In December, Darwin received a letter from Wallace asking if the book would examine human origins. He responded that he would avoid that subject, "so surrounded with prejudices", while encouraging Wallace's theorising and adding that "I go much further than you."

Darwin's book was only partly written when, on 18 June 1858, he received a paper from Wallace describing natural selection. Shocked that he had been "forestalled", Darwin sent it on that day to Lyell, as requested by Wallace, and although Wallace had not asked for publication, Darwin suggested he would send it to any journal that Wallace chose. His family was in crisis with children in the village dying of scarlet fever, and he put matters in the hands of his friends. After some discussion, with no reliable way of involving Wallace, Lyell and Hooker decided on a joint presentation at the Linnean Society on 1 July of On the Tendency of Species to form Varieties; and on the Perpetuation of Varieties and Species by Natural Means of Selection. On the evening of 28 June, Darwin's baby son died of scarlet fever after almost a week of severe illness, and he was too distraught to attend.

There was little immediate attention to this announcement of the theory; the president of the Linnean Society remarked in May 1859 that the year had not been marked by any revolutionary discoveries. Only one review rankled enough for Darwin to recall it later; Professor Samuel Haughton of Dublin claimed that "all that was new in them was false, and what was true was old". Darwin struggled for thirteen months to produce an abstract of his "big book", suffering from ill health but getting constant encouragement from his scientific friends. Lyell arranged to have it published by John Murray.

On the Origin of Species proved unexpectedly popular, with the entire stock of 1,250 copies oversubscribed when it went on sale to booksellers on 22 November 1859. In the book, Darwin set out "one long argument" of detailed observations, inferences and consideration of anticipated objections. In making the case for common descent, he included evidence of homologies between humans and other mammals. Having outlined sexual selection, he hinted that it could explain differences between human races. He avoided explicit discussion of human origins, but implied the significance of his work with the sentence; "Light will be thrown on the origin of man and his history." His theory is simply stated in the introduction:

At the end of the book he concluded that:

The last word was the only variant of "evolved" in the first five editions of the book. "Evolutionism" at that time was associated with other concepts, most commonly with embryological development. Darwin first used the word evolution in The Descent of Man in 1871, before adding it in 1872 to the 6th edition of The Origin of Species.

Responses to publication

The book aroused international interest, with less controversy than had greeted the popular and less scientific Vestiges of the Natural History of Creation. Though Darwin's illness kept him away from the public debates, he eagerly scrutinised the scientific response, commenting on press cuttings, reviews, articles, satires and caricatures, and corresponded on it with colleagues worldwide. The book did not explicitly discuss human origins, but included a number of hints about the animal ancestry of humans from which the inference could be made.

The first review asked, "If a monkey has become a man – what may not a man become?" It said this should be left to theologians as being too dangerous for ordinary readers. Amongst early favourable responses, Huxley's reviews swiped at Richard Owen, leader of the scientific establishment which Huxley was trying to overthrow.

In April, Owen's review attacked Darwin's friends and condescendingly dismissed his ideas, angering Darwin, but Owen and others began to promote ideas of supernaturally guided evolution. Patrick Matthew drew attention to his 1831 book which had a brief appendix suggesting a concept of natural selection leading to new species, but he had not developed the idea.

The Church of England's response was mixed. Darwin's old Cambridge tutors Sedgwick and Henslow dismissed the ideas, but liberal clergymen interpreted natural selection as an instrument of God's design, with the cleric Charles Kingsley seeing it as "just as noble a conception of Deity". In 1860, the publication of Essays and Reviews by seven liberal Anglican theologians diverted clerical attention from Darwin. Its ideas, including higher criticism, were attacked by church authorities as heresy. In it, Baden Powell argued that miracles broke God's laws, so belief in them was atheistic, and praised "Mr Darwin's masterly volume [supporting] the grand principle of the self-evolving powers of nature".

Asa Gray discussed teleology with Darwin, who imported and distributed Gray's pamphlet on theistic evolution, Natural Selection is not inconsistent with natural theology. The most famous confrontation was at the public 1860 Oxford evolution debate during a meeting of the British Association for the Advancement of Science, where the Bishop of Oxford Samuel Wilberforce, though not opposed to transmutation of species, argued against Darwin's explanation and human descent from apes. Joseph Hooker argued strongly for Darwin, and Thomas Huxley's legendary retort, that he would rather be descended from an ape than a man who misused his gifts, came to symbolise a triumph of science over religion.

Even Darwin's close friends Gray, Hooker, Huxley and Lyell still expressed various reservations but gave strong support, as did many others, particularly younger naturalists. Gray and Lyell sought reconciliation with faith, while Huxley portrayed a polarisation between religion and science. He campaigned pugnaciously against the authority of the clergy in education, aiming to overturn the dominance of clergymen and aristocratic amateurs under Owen in favour of a new generation of professional scientists. Owen's claim that brain anatomy proved humans to be a separate biological order from apes was shown to be false by Huxley in a long running dispute parodied by Kingsley as the "Great Hippocampus Question", and discredited Owen.
In response to objections that the origin of life was unexplained, Darwin pointed to acceptance of Newton's law even though the cause of gravity was unknown.

Darwinism became a movement covering a wide range of evolutionary ideas. In 1863 Lyell's Geological Evidences of the Antiquity of Man popularised prehistory, though his caution on evolution disappointed Darwin. Weeks later Huxley's Evidence as to Man's Place in Nature showed that anatomically, humans are apes, then The Naturalist on the River Amazons by Henry Walter Bates provided empirical evidence of natural selection. Lobbying brought Darwin Britain's highest scientific honour, the Royal Society's Copley Medal, awarded on 3 November 1864. That day, Huxley held the first meeting of what became the influential "X Club" devoted to "science, pure and free, untrammelled by religious dogmas". By the end of the decade most scientists agreed that evolution occurred, but only a minority supported Darwin's view that the chief mechanism was natural selection.

The Origin of Species was translated into many languages, becoming a staple scientific text attracting thoughtful attention from all walks of life, including the "working men" who flocked to Huxley's lectures. Darwin's theory resonated with various movements at the time and became a key fixture of popular culture. Cartoonists parodied animal ancestry in an old tradition of showing humans with animal traits, and in Britain these droll images served to popularise Darwin's theory in an unthreatening way. While ill in 1862 Darwin began growing a beard, and when he reappeared in public in 1866 caricatures of him as an ape helped to identify all forms of evolutionism with Darwinism.

Descent of Man, sexual selection, and botany

Despite repeated bouts of illness during the last twenty-two years of his life, Darwin's work continued. Having published On the Origin of Species as an abstract of his theory, he pressed on with experiments, research, and writing of his "big book". He covered human descent from earlier animals including evolution of society and of mental abilities, as well as explaining decorative beauty in wildlife and diversifying into innovative plant studies.

Enquiries about insect pollination led in 1861 to novel studies of wild orchids, showing adaptation of their flowers to attract specific moths to each species and ensure cross fertilisation. In 1862 Fertilisation of Orchids gave his first detailed demonstration of the power of natural selection to explain complex ecological relationships, making testable predictions. As his health declined, he lay on his sickbed in a room filled with inventive experiments to trace the movements of climbing plants. Admiring visitors included Ernst Haeckel, a zealous proponent of Darwinism incorporating Lamarckism and Goethe's idealism. Wallace remained supportive, though he increasingly turned to Spiritualism.

Darwin's book The Variation of Animals and Plants Under Domestication (1868) was the first part of his planned "big book", and included his unsuccessful hypothesis of pangenesis attempting to explain heredity. It sold briskly at first, despite its size, and was translated into many languages. He wrote most of a second part, on natural selection, but it remained unpublished in his lifetime.

Lyell had already popularised human prehistory, and Huxley had shown that anatomically humans are apes. With The Descent of Man, and Selection in Relation to Sex published in 1871, Darwin set out evidence from numerous sources that humans are animals, showing continuity of physical and mental attributes, and presented sexual selection to explain impractical animal features such as the peacock's plumage as well as human evolution of culture, differences between sexes, and physical and cultural racial classification, while emphasizing that humans are all one species. According to an editorial in Nature journal: "Although Charles Darwin opposed slavery and proposed that humans have a common ancestor, he also advocated a hierarchy of races, with white people higher than others."

His research using images was expanded in his 1872 book The Expression of the Emotions in Man and Animals, one of the first books to feature printed photographs, which discussed the evolution of human psychology and its continuity with the behaviour of animals. Both books proved very popular, and Darwin was impressed by the general assent with which his views had been received, remarking that "everybody is talking about it without being shocked." His conclusion was "that man with all his noble qualities, with sympathy which feels for the most debased, with benevolence which extends not only to other men but to the humblest living creature, with his god-like intellect which has penetrated into the movements and constitution of the solar system—with all these exalted powers—Man still bears in his bodily frame the indelible stamp of his lowly origin."

His evolution-related experiments and investigations led to books on Insectivorous Plants, The Effects of Cross and Self Fertilisation in the Vegetable Kingdom, different forms of flowers on plants of the same species, and The Power of Movement in Plants. He continued to collect information and exchange views from scientific correspondents all over the world, including Mary Treat, whom he encouraged to persevere in her scientific work. He was the first person to recognize the significance of carnivory in plants. His botanical work was interpreted and popularised by various writers including Grant Allen and H. G. Wells, and helped transform plant science in the late 19th century and early 20th century.

Death and funeral

In 1882 he was diagnosed with what was called "angina pectoris" which then meant coronary thrombosis and disease of the heart. At the time of his death, the physicians diagnosed "anginal attacks", and "heart-failure"; there has since been scholarly speculation about his life-long health issues.

He died at Down House on 19 April 1882. His last words were to his family, telling Emma "I am not the least afraid of deathRemember what a good wife you have been to meTell all my children to remember how good they have been to me". While she rested, he repeatedly told Henrietta and Francis "It's almost worth while to be sick to be nursed by you".

He had expected to be buried in St Mary's churchyard at Downe, but at the request of Darwin's colleagues, after public and parliamentary petitioning, William Spottiswoode (President of the Royal Society) arranged for Darwin to be honoured by burial in Westminster Abbey, close to John Herschel and Isaac Newton. The funeral, held on Wednesday 26 April, was attended by thousands of people, including family, friends, scientists, philosophers and dignitaries.

Legacy

As Alfred Russel Wallace put it, Darwin had "wrought a greater revolution in human thought within a quarter of a century than any man of our time – or perhaps any time", having "given us a new conception of the world of life, and a theory which is itself a powerful instrument of research; has shown us how to combine into one consistent whole the facts accumulated by all the separate classes of workers, and has thereby revolutionised the whole study of nature".

Most scientists were now convinced of evolution as descent with modification, though few agreed with Darwin that natural selection "has been the main but not the exclusive means of modification".
During "the eclipse of Darwinism" scientists explored alternative mechanisms. Then Ronald Fisher incorporated Mendelian genetics in The Genetical Theory of Natural Selection, leading to population genetics and the modern evolutionary synthesis, which continues to develop. Scientific discoveries have confirmed and validated Darwin's key insights.

Commemoration

Geographical features given his name include Darwin Sound and Mount Darwin, both named while he was on the Beagle voyage, and Darwin Harbour, named by his former shipmates on its next voyage, which eventually became the location of Darwin, the capital city of Australia's Northern Territory.
Darwin's name was given, formally or informally, to numerous plants and animals, including many he had collected on the voyage. Some names were given later, for example, tanagers found in the Galápagos Islands became popularly known as "Darwin's finches" in 1947.

In 1883 Sir Joseph Boehm sculpted a white marble life-size seated statue of Darwin. It was installed at the top of the main staircase in the Central Hall of the Natural History Museum in London, and unveiled on 9 June 1885 by Thomas Huxley in the presence of Edward, Prince of Wales, Bartholomew Sulivan, and Joseph Parslow at the ceremony. In 1927 its place was taken by an elephant, and in 1970 it was moved to the North Hall of the museum, then in May 2008 the statue was moved back to its original place, displacing a statue of the Museum's founder Richard Owen.

Darwin's children, now eminent, preserved his memory. In 1887 Francis Darwin published Life and Letters with his own reminiscences of his father, an autobiography Darwin had written for his family (edited to spare the sensitivities of Darwin's widow Emma), and correspondence. More volumes of correspondence followed.

The Shrewsbury School building, which Darwin attended as a boy, became the Free Library. A seated statue of Darwin was installed outside it, and unveiled in 1897.

The Linnean Society of London began awards of the Darwin–Wallace Medal in 1908, to mark fifty years from the joint reading on 1 July 1858 of papers by Darwin and Wallace publishing their theory. Further awards were made in 1958 and 2008, since 2010 the medal awards have been annual.

In June 1909, more than 400 officials and scientists from across the world met in Cambridge to commemorate Darwin's centenary and the fiftieth anniversary of On the Origin of Species, with exhibitions and events.

The Darwin Centennial Celebration in 1959, on the centenary of On the Origin of Species and 150 years from Darwin's birth, had major commemorations at the University of Chicago. It featured the evolutionary synthesis, and claims to Darwin's legacy by biologists with differing views. It was marked by Gavin de Beer beginning publication of Darwin's manuscripts including his private notebooks, and a new generation of science historians began investigating the Darwin papers archived at Cambridge, starting the "Darwin Industry".

Darwin College, a postgraduate college at Cambridge University founded in 1964, is named after the Darwin family. From 2000 to 2017, UK £10 banknotes issued by the Bank of England featured Darwin's portrait printed on the reverse, along with a hummingbird and HMS Beagle.

In 2009 worldwide events, programmes and publications celebrated the bicentenary of Darwin's birth and the 150th anniversary of the publication of On the Origin of Species. Marking his bicentenary, a statue of Darwin as a young man was placed in a courtyard of his alma mater, Christ's College, Cambridge. Darwin Day became an annual celebration. Darwin was further commemorated on a series of UK postage stamps issued by the Royal Mail in 2009 with six "jigsaw" shaped stamps symbolising how his studies of different disciplines formed his new ideas on evolution. 

Beagle: In Darwin's wake was a Dutch-Flemish television series from 2009 and 2010 initiated by the VPRO in collaboration with Teleac and Canvas to commemorate the 150th anniversary of Darwin's On the Origin of Species. The series features an 8-month voyage around the world (commenced on 1 September 2009) on board the clipper Stad Amsterdam, which follows the route of the five-year-long voyage of Darwin between 1831 and 1836. Biologist Sarah Darwin (the great-great-granddaughter of Charles Darwin) is one of the recurring shipmates who appear in the series.

Children

The Darwins had ten children: two died in infancy, and Annie's death at the age of ten had a devastating effect on her parents. Charles was a devoted father and uncommonly attentive to his children. Whenever they fell ill, he feared that they might have inherited weaknesses from inbreeding due to the close family ties he shared with his wife and cousin, Emma Wedgwood. He examined inbreeding in his writings, contrasting it with the advantages of outcrossing in many species. 

Charles Waring Darwin, born in December 1856, was the tenth and last of the children. Emma Darwin was aged 48 at the time of the birth, and the child was mentally subnormal and never learnt to walk or talk. He probably had Down syndrome, which had not then been medically described. The evidence is a photograph by William Erasmus Darwin of the infant and his mother, showing a characteristic head shape, and the family's observations of the child. Charles Waring died of scarlet fever on 28 June 1858, when Darwin wrote in his journal "Poor dear Baby died." 

Of his surviving children, George, Francis and Horace became Fellows of the Royal Society, distinguished as astronomer, botanist and civil engineer, respectively. All three were knighted. Another son, Leonard, went on to be a soldier, politician, economist, eugenicist and mentor of the statistician and evolutionary biologist Ronald Fisher.

Views and opinions

Religious views

Darwin's family tradition was nonconformist Unitarianism, while his father and grandfather were freethinkers, and his baptism and boarding school were Church of England. When going to Cambridge to become an Anglican clergyman, he did not "in the least doubt the strict and literal truth of every word in the Bible". He learned John Herschel's science which, like William Paley's natural theology, sought explanations in laws of nature rather than miracles and saw adaptation of species as evidence of design. On board HMS Beagle, Darwin was quite orthodox and would quote the Bible as an authority on morality. He looked for "centres of creation" to explain distribution, and suggested that the very similar antlions found in Australia and England were evidence of a divine hand.

By his return, he was critical of the Bible as history, and wondered why all religions should not be equally valid. In the next few years, while intensively speculating on geology and the transmutation of species, he gave much thought to religion and openly discussed this with his wife Emma, whose beliefs similarly came from intensive study and questioning.

The theodicy of Paley and Thomas Malthus vindicated evils such as starvation as a result of a benevolent creator's laws, which had an overall good effect. To Darwin, natural selection produced the good of adaptation but removed the need for design, and he could not see the work of an omnipotent deity in all the pain and suffering, such as the ichneumon wasp paralysing caterpillars as live food for its eggs. Though he thought of religion as a tribal survival strategy, Darwin was reluctant to give up the idea of God as an ultimate lawgiver. He was increasingly troubled by the problem of evil.

Darwin remained close friends with the vicar of Downe, John Brodie Innes, and continued to play a leading part in the parish work of the church, but from around 1849 would go for a walk on Sundays while his family attended church. He considered it "absurd to doubt that a man might be an ardent theist and an evolutionist" and, though reticent about his religious views, in 1879 he wrote that "I have never been an atheist in the sense of denying the existence of a God. – I think that generally ... an agnostic would be the most correct description of my state of mind".

The "Lady Hope Story", published in 1915, claimed that Darwin had reverted to Christianity on his sickbed. The claims were repudiated by Darwin's children and have been dismissed as false by historians.

Human society

Darwin's views on social and political issues reflected his time and social position. He grew up in a family of Whig reformers who, like his uncle Josiah Wedgwood, supported electoral reform and the emancipation of slaves. Darwin was passionately opposed to slavery, while seeing no problem with the working conditions of English factory workers or servants.

Taking taxidermy lessons in 1826 from the freed slave John Edmonstone, whom Darwin long recalled as "a very pleasant and intelligent man", reinforced his belief that black people shared the same feelings, and could be as intelligent as people of other races. He took the same attitude to native people he met on the Beagle voyage. Though commonplace in Britain at the time, Silliman and Bachman noticed the contrast with slave-owning America. Around twenty years later, racism became a feature of British society, but Darwin remained strongly against slavery, against "ranking the so-called races of man as distinct species", and against ill-treatment of native people.

Darwin's interaction with Yaghans (Fuegians) such as Jemmy Button during the second voyage of HMS Beagle had a profound impact on his view of indigenous peoples. At his arrival in Tierra del Fuego he made a colourful description of "Fuegian savages". This view changed as he came to know Yaghan people more in detail. By studying the Yaghans, Darwin concluded that a number of basic emotions by different human groups were the same and that mental capabilities were roughly the same as for Europeans. While interested in Yaghan culture Darwin failed to appreciate their deep ecological knowledge and elaborate cosmology until the 1850s when he inspected a dictionary of Yaghan detailing 32,000 words. He saw that European colonisation would often lead to the extinction of native civilisations, and "tr[ied] to integrate colonialism into an evolutionary history of civilization analogous to natural history".

He thought men's eminence over women was the outcome of sexual selection, a view disputed by Antoinette Brown Blackwell in her 1875 book The Sexes Throughout Nature.

Darwin was intrigued by his half-cousin Francis Galton's argument, introduced in 1865, that statistical analysis of heredity showed that moral and mental human traits could be inherited, and principles of animal breeding could apply to humans. In The Descent of Man, Darwin noted that aiding the weak to survive and have families could lose the benefits of natural selection, but cautioned that withholding such aid would endanger the instinct of sympathy, "the noblest part of our nature", and factors such as education could be more important. When Galton suggested that publishing research could encourage intermarriage within a "caste" of "those who are naturally gifted", Darwin foresaw practical difficulties, and thought it "the sole feasible, yet I fear utopian, plan of procedure in improving the human race", preferring to simply publicise the importance of inheritance and leave decisions to individuals. Francis Galton named this field of study "eugenics" in 1883, after Darwin's death, and his theories were cited to promote eugenic policies.

Evolutionary social movements

Darwin's fame and popularity led to his name being associated with ideas and movements that, at times, had only an indirect relation to his writings, and sometimes went directly against his express comments.

Thomas Malthus had argued that population growth beyond resources was ordained by God to get humans to work productively and show restraint in getting families; this was used in the 1830s to justify workhouses and laissez-faire economics. Evolution was by then seen as having social implications, and Herbert Spencer's 1851 book Social Statics based ideas of human freedom and individual liberties on his Lamarckian evolutionary theory.

Soon after the Origin was published in 1859, critics derided his description of a struggle for existence as a Malthusian justification for the English industrial capitalism of the time. The term Darwinism was used for the evolutionary ideas of others, including Spencer's "survival of the fittest" as free-market progress, and Ernst Haeckel's polygenistic ideas of human development. Writers used natural selection to argue for various, often contradictory, ideologies such as laissez-faire dog-eat-dog capitalism, colonialism and imperialism. However, Darwin's holistic view of nature included "dependence of one being on another"; thus pacifists, socialists, liberal social reformers and anarchists such as Peter Kropotkin stressed the value of co-operation over struggle within a species. Darwin himself insisted that social policy should not simply be guided by concepts of struggle and selection in nature.

After the 1880s, a eugenics movement developed on ideas of biological inheritance, and for scientific justification of their ideas appealed to some concepts of Darwinism. In Britain, most shared Darwin's cautious views on voluntary improvement and sought to encourage those with good traits in "positive eugenics". During the "Eclipse of Darwinism", a scientific foundation for eugenics was provided by Mendelian genetics. Negative eugenics to remove the "feebleminded" were popular in America, Canada and Australia, and eugenics in the United States introduced compulsory sterilisation laws, followed by several other countries. Subsequently, Nazi eugenics brought the field into disrepute.

The term "Social Darwinism" was used infrequently from around the 1890s, but became popular as a derogatory term in the 1940s when used by Richard Hofstadter to attack the laissez-faire conservatism of those like William Graham Sumner who opposed reform and socialism. Since then, it has been used as a term of abuse by those opposed to what they think are the moral consequences of evolution.

Works

Darwin was a prolific writer. Even without publication of his works on evolution, he would have had a considerable reputation as the author of The Voyage of the Beagle, as a geologist who had published extensively on South America and had solved the puzzle of the formation of coral atolls, and as a biologist who had published the definitive work on barnacles. While On the Origin of Species dominates perceptions of his work, The Descent of Man and The Expression of the Emotions in Man and Animals had considerable impact, and his books on plants including The Power of Movement in Plants were innovative studies of great importance, as was his final work on The Formation of Vegetable Mould through the Action of Worms.

Arms

See also

 1991 Darwin
 :Category:Cultural depictions of Charles Darwin
 Creation (biographical drama film)
 Creation–evolution controversy
 European and American voyages of scientific exploration
 History of biology
 History of evolutionary thought
 List of coupled cousins
 List of multiple discoveries
 Multiple discovery
 Portraits of Charles Darwin
 Tinamou egg
 Universal Darwinism

Notes

.  Robert FitzRoy was to become known after the voyage for biblical literalism, but at this time he had considerable interest in Lyell's ideas, and they met before the voyage when Lyell asked for observations to be made in South America. FitzRoy's diary during the ascent of the River Santa Cruz in Patagonia recorded his opinion that the plains were raised beaches, but on return, newly married to a very religious lady, he recanted these ideas.

.  In the section "Morphology" of Chapter XIII of On the Origin of Species, Darwin commented on homologous bone patterns between humans and other mammals, writing: "What can be more curious than that the hand of a man, formed for grasping, that of a mole for digging, the leg of the horse, the paddle of the porpoise, and the wing of the bat, should all be constructed on the same pattern, and should include the same bones, in the same relative positions?" and in the concluding chapter: "The framework of bones being the same in the hand of a man, wing of a bat, fin of the porpoise, and leg of the horse … at once explain themselves on the theory of descent with slow and slight successive modifications."

. 
In On the Origin of Species Darwin mentioned human origins in his concluding remark that "In the distant future I see open fields for far more important researches. Psychology will be based on a new foundation, that of the necessary acquirement of each mental power and capacity by gradation. Light will be thrown on the origin of man and his history."

In "Chapter VI: Difficulties on Theory" he referred to sexual selection: "I might have adduced for this same purpose the differences between the races of man, which are so strongly marked; I may add that some little light can apparently be thrown on the origin of these differences, chiefly through sexual selection of a particular kind, but without here entering on copious details my reasoning would appear frivolous."

In The Descent of Man of 1871, Darwin discussed the first passage:
"During many years I collected notes on the origin or descent of man, without any intention of publishing on the subject, but rather with the determination not to publish, as I thought that I should thus only add to the prejudices against my views. It seemed to me sufficient to indicate, in the first edition of my 'Origin of Species,' that by this work 'light would be thrown on the origin of man and his history;' and this implies that man must be included with other organic beings in any general conclusion respecting his manner of appearance on this earth." In a preface to the 1874 second edition, he added a reference to the second point: "it has been said by several critics, that when I found that many details of structure in man could not be explained through natural selection, I invented sexual selection; I gave, however, a tolerably clear sketch of this principle in the first edition of the 'Origin of Species,' and I there stated that it was applicable to man."

.  See, for example, WILLA volume 4, Charlotte Perkins Gilman and the Feminization of Education by Deborah M. De Simone: "Gilman shared many basic educational ideas with the generation of thinkers who matured during the period of "intellectual chaos" caused by Darwin's Origin of the Species. Marked by the belief that individuals can direct human and social evolution, many progressives came to view education as the panacea for advancing social progress and for solving such problems as urbanisation, poverty, or immigration."

.  See, for example, the song "A lady fair of lineage high" from Gilbert and Sullivan's Princess Ida, which describes the descent of man (but not woman!) from apes.

.  Darwin's belief that black people had the same essential humanity as Europeans, and had many mental similarities, was reinforced by the lessons he had from John Edmonstone in 1826. Early in the Beagle voyage, Darwin nearly lost his position on the ship when he criticised FitzRoy's defence and praise of slavery.  He wrote home about "how steadily the general feeling, as shown at elections, has been rising against Slavery. What a proud thing for England if she is the first European nation which utterly abolishes it! I was told before leaving England that after living in slave countries all my opinions would be altered; the only alteration I am aware of is forming a much higher estimate of the negro character."  Regarding Fuegians, he "could not have believed how wide was the difference between savage and civilized man: it is greater than between a wild and domesticated animal, inasmuch as in man there is a greater power of improvement", but he knew and liked civilised Fuegians like Jemmy Button: "It seems yet wonderful to me, when I think over all his many good qualities, that he should have been of the same race, and doubtless partaken of the same character, with the miserable, degraded savages whom we first met here." 

In the Descent of Man, he mentioned the similarity of Fuegians' and Edmonstone's minds to Europeans' when arguing against "ranking the so-called races of man as distinct species".

He rejected the ill-treatment of native people, and for example wrote of massacres of Patagonian men, women, and children, "Every one here is fully convinced that this is the most just war, because it is against barbarians. Who would believe in this age that such atrocities could be committed in a Christian civilized country?"

.  Geneticists studied human heredity as Mendelian inheritance, while eugenics movements sought to manage society, with a focus on social class in the United Kingdom, and on disability and ethnicity in the United States, leading to geneticists seeing this movement as impractical pseudoscience. A shift from voluntary arrangements to "negative" eugenics included compulsory sterilisation laws in the United States, copied by Nazi Germany as the basis for Nazi eugenics based on virulent racism and "racial hygiene".( )

.  David Quammen writes of his "theory that [Darwin] turned to these arcane botanical studies – producing more than one book that was solidly empirical, discreetly evolutionary, yet a 'horrid bore' – at least partly so that the clamorous controversialists, fighting about apes and angels and souls, would leave him... alone". David Quammen, "The Brilliant Plodder" (review of Ken Thompson, Darwin's Most Wonderful Plants: A Tour of His Botanical Legacy, University of Chicago Press, 255 pp.; Elizabeth Hennessy, On the Backs of Tortoises: Darwin, the Galápagos, and the Fate of an Evolutionary Eden, Yale University Press, 310 pp.; Bill Jenkins, Evolution Before Darwin: Theories of the Transmutation of Species in Edinburgh, 1804–1834, Edinburgh University Press, 222 pp.), The New York Review of Books, vol. LXVII, no. 7 (23 April 2020), pp. 22–24. Quammen, quoted from p. 24 of his review.

Citations

References

External links

 
 
 
 
 The Complete Works of Charles Darwin Online – Darwin Online; Darwin's publications, private papers and bibliography, supplementary works including biographies, obituaries and reviews
 Darwin Correspondence Project Full text and notes for complete correspondence to 1867, with summaries of all the rest, and pages of commentary
 Darwin Manuscript Project
 
 View books owned and annotated by Charles Darwin at the online Biodiversity Heritage Library.
 Digitised Darwin Manuscripts in Cambridge Digital Library
 
 
 Charles Darwin in the British horticultural press – Occasional Papers from RHS Lindley Library, volume 3 July 2010
 Scientific American, 29 April 1882, pp. 256, Obituary of Charles Darwin

 
1809 births
1882 deaths
19th-century British biologists
19th-century English writers
Alumni of Christ's College, Cambridge
Alumni of the University of Edinburgh
Botanists with author abbreviations
British carcinologists
Burials at Westminster Abbey
Circumnavigators of the globe
Coleopterists
Darwin–Wedgwood family
Deaths from coronary thrombosis
English abolitionists
English agnostics
English Anglicans
English entomologists
English geologists
English justices of the peace
English naturalists
English sceptics
English travel writers
Ethologists
British evolutionary biologists
Fellows of the Linnean Society of London
Fellows of the Royal Entomological Society
Fellows of the Royal Geographical Society
Fellows of the Royal Society
Fellows of the Zoological Society of London
Human evolution theorists
Human evolution
Independent scientists
Members of the American Philosophical Society
Members of the Lincean Academy
Members of the Royal Academy of Belgium
Members of the Royal Netherlands Academy of Arts and Sciences
Members of the Royal Swedish Academy of Sciences
People educated at Shrewsbury School
Scientists from Shrewsbury
Recipients of the Copley Medal
Recipients of the Pour le Mérite (civil class)
Royal Medal winners
Theoretical biologists
Utilitarians
Wollaston Medal winners